1490 Limpopo, provisional designation , is a carbonaceous–metallic asteroid from the inner regions of the asteroid belt, approximately 18 kilometers in diameter. It was discovered on 14 June 1936, by English-born South African astronomer Cyril Jackson at Johannesburg Observatory in South Africa. It was named for the Limpopo River.

Orbit 

Limpopo orbits the Sun in the inner main-belt at a distance of 2.0–2.7 AU once every 3 years and 7 months (1,318 days). Its orbit has an eccentricity of 0.16 and an inclination of 10° with respect to the ecliptic. The body's observation arc begins 2 weeks prior to its official discovery observation.

Rotation period 

Between August and November 2005, three rotational lightcurves of Limpopo were obtained from photometric observations by French amateur astronomer Laurent Bernasconi, Pedro Sada at the Mexican Monterrey Observatory, and Dicy Saylor at University of Georgia, United States. The lightcurves gave a rotation period between 6.15 and 6.647 hours with a brightness variation of 0.15–0.26 magnitude.

Diameter and albedo 

According to the surveys carried out by the Infrared Astronomical Satellite IRAS, the Japanese Akari satellite, and NASA's Wide-field Infrared Survey Explorer with its subsequent NEOWISE mission, Limpopo measures between 14.84 and 20.21 kilometers in diameter and its surface has an albedo between 0.068 and 0.105. The Collaborative Asteroid Lightcurve Link derives an albedo of 0.0742 and a diameter of 18.55 kilometers based on an absolute magnitude of 12.1. The X-type asteroid is also classified as a metallic M-type by WISE and as a carbonaceous intermediate Xc-type in the SMASS taxonomy.

Naming 

This minor planet was named after the Limpopo River, which rises in central southern Africa, and flows through Botswana, Mozambique, South Africa and Zimbabwe into the Indian Ocean. The official  was published by the Minor Planet Center in April 1953.

References

External links 
 Asteroid Lightcurve Database (LCDB), query form (info )
 Dictionary of Minor Planet Names, Google books
 Asteroids and comets rotation curves, CdR – Observatoire de Genève, Raoul Behrend
 Discovery Circumstances: Numbered Minor Planets (1)-(5000)  – Minor Planet Center
 
 

001490
Discoveries by Cyril Jackson (astronomer)
Named minor planets
001490
19360614